Te Aihe Toma (born 15 March 1993) is a New Zealand rugby union footballer who currently plays as a Halfback for the  Steamers in the Mitre 10 Cup.

Provincial career

Toma debuted for Bay of Plenty during the 2013 season and went on to become more of a regular through to 2015 where he featured in a career high 11 matches and scored one try in the process.

Munster

On 7 November 2016, it was announced that Toma had joined Irish Pro12 side Munster on a short-term loan. On 2 December 2016, Toma made his competitive debut for Munster when he came on as a replacement for Duncan Williams in a 2016–17 Pro12 fixture against Scottish side Glasgow Warriors.

Super Rugby

Toma spent the early part of the 2016 Super Rugby season with the  Development Squad, however a halfback crisis which saw Aaron Smith, Fumiaki Tanaka and Josh Renton all ruled out after the 2016 mid-year rugby union internationals break led to Toma receiving a call up to the Highlanders squad for their tours of South Africa and Argentina.   In all, Toma made 3 appearances for the Highlanders, starting one game as they reached the semi-finals of the competition.

Super Rugby statistics

References

External links
 Munster Profile

1993 births
Living people
New Zealand rugby union players
Rugby union scrum-halves
Highlanders (rugby union) players
Bay of Plenty rugby union players
Munster Rugby players